The Astonishing Fury of Mankind is the debut studio album by French metal band Darkness Dynamite.

Track listing 
All tracks by Darkness Dynamite

 "Supernatural" – 3:17
 "Hell Eve Hate" – 2:59 
 "Immersion Inner-Nation" – 3:54
 "$15" – 4:33
 "Chasing Inside" – 3:56
 "A Simple Taste of..." – 0:59
 "Vice!" – 3:19
 "By My Own" – 3:17
 "Dare I Say" – 2:56
 "The Everlasting Grace of Mind" – 3:18
 "The Astonishing Fury of Mankind" – 5:52

Personnel 
 Junior Rodriguez – lead vocals
 Nelson Angelo Martins – lead guitar, backing vocals, keyboards
 Zack Larbi – rhythm guitar, backing vocals
 Christophe De Oliveira – bass guitar
 Julien «Power» Granger – drums

Production
 Engineered by Stephane Buriez (Guitars), Olivier T'servranex (Drums), Nelson Martins and Junior Rodriguez, at Elektricbox Studio, Lille
 Mixed and mastered by Remyboy, at Ahddenteam Studio, Lille

References 

Darkness Dynamite albums
2009 debut albums